PHProjekt is a free groupware and project management web application written in PHP.  It was created in the late 1990s by Albrecht Günther; since early 2006, Mayflower GmbH develops and supports PHProjekt along with Günther.

PHProjekt is the only Free software project management software included in the SimpleScripts script installer, and one of two included in the Fantastico script installer (along with dotProject).  The software's functionality can be expanded through various add-on packages (including one for synchronization with Microsoft Outlook). PHProjekt is available in several languages.

After releasing version 6.2.1, Mayflower GmbH announced they will not continue the development of PHProjekt.

Modules 
 Overview
 Calendar
 Contacts
 Chat
 Forum
 Files
 Projects
 Time card
 Notes
 Helpdesk
 Mail
 Tasks
 Bookmark
 Survey System

See also
 Project management software
 List of project management software

Notes

External links 

 
 Unofficial PHProjekt mailing list

Project management software
Free software programmed in PHP